Surajya is a 2014  Indian Marathi language movie. 
The movie marks the debut of Vaibbhav Tatwawdi and is directed by award-winning Director of Mi Shivaji Raje Bhosale Boltoi fame Santosh Manjrekar. Music and Background score is given by Pankaj Padgham and Cinematography is by Vikramkumar Amladi.
Vector Projects mark their entry into the Movie Industry with this movie.

Times of India praised the performances of the actors and commented that the film is "definitely a one-time watch".

Plot

When a young interior designer goes to his native place, the absence of a hospital there shocks him. He them embarks on a quest to get basic medical facilities to his village.

The residents of Mashem in Goa are god-fearing people who are afraid to go against the word of a Godman in the village. Such is the fear in them that they fail to speak up even when they witness money being collected in the name of God and being stacked in the hermitage locker.

Having been posted in Goa, Omkar (Vaibbhav Tatwawdi) decides to spend a week with his parents at his village. His father Ramdas ( Sharad Ponkshe) who is the local priest, asks Omkar to go around and collect money from the residents for the renovation of the hermitage. While doing this, Omkar comes across an old lady lying on her deathbed who cannot afford treatment because the nearest hospital is an hour away. By the time Omkar and his friend Bandya (Shriram Patki) get her to the hospital, she dies, and this jolts Omkar. He, along with his love interest Dr Swapna Bhosale ( Mrunal Thakur) and Bandya tries to get funds from the hermitage for constructing a hospital but to no effect. That is when they take an oath to fight for the welfare of the people, by hook or by crook.

Cast
 Vaibbhav Tatwawdi as Omkar Prabhu
 Mrunal Thakur as Dr. Swapna Bhosale
 Dr. Sriram Patki as Bandya
 Sharad Ponkshe as Ramdas Prabhu
 Madhav Abhyankar as Swamy Sudarshan Maharaj
 Pournima Manohar as Omkar's Mother
 Vinayak Bhave as Manohar Swamy

Soundtrack

References

2014 films
Indian drama films
2010s Marathi-language films
2014 drama films